Darreh Zang or Darreh-ye Zang may refer to:
 Darreh Zang, Dehdez, Khuzestan Province
 Darreh Zang, Susan, Khuzestan Province
 Darreh Zang, Kohgiluyeh and Boyer-Ahmad